Kassya is a French-language opera in 4 acts and 5 tableaux by Léo Delibes to a libretto by Henri Meilhac and Philippe Gille after a novella by Sacher-Masoch. Unfinished on Delibes' death in 1891, it was completed and orchestrated by Jules Massenet in 1893.

The opera was premiered at the Opéra-Comique, Paris, on 24 March 1893, with the following cast:

Sonia –  Mlle Simonnet  
Kassya –  Mme De Nuovina  
La Bohémienne –  Mlle Elven  
Nidda –  Mlle Delorn 
Lacka –  Mlle Robert  
Cyrille –  M. Gibert  
Le comte de Zévale –  M Soulacroios
Kotska –  M. Lorrain 
Kolénati –  M. Challet  
Mockou –  M. Bernaert  
Un sergent –  M. Artus  
Yahn –  M. Troy
Source: Les Annales du théâtre et de la musique, 1893.

The opera was respectfully received, but the general view was that it showed the composer's creative gifts in decline. It ran for twelve performances.

References

Sources
 

Operas
1893 operas
Operas by Léo Delibes
Operas completed by others
French-language operas
Unfinished operas